Anatomy of the Infinite is the second album from Australian black metal band Astriaal.

Track listing

Personnel
 Arzarkhel – Vocals
 Gryphon - Drums
 Baaruhl - Guitars, bass
 Helthor – Guitars, bass

References

Astriaal albums
2010 albums